Alfredo Biondi (29 June 1928 – 24 June 2020) was an Italian politician and lawyer. In 1994 he served as Minister of Justice of the Italian Republic during the first cabinet chaired by Silvio Berlusconi.

Biography
Born in Pisa, Biondi was Secretary of the Italian Liberal Party (PLI) from 1985 to 1986, and later its president. He was a member of the Italian Chamber of Deputies from June 1968 to May 1972, and then from June 1983 to April 2006. He was a Senator from April 2006 to April 2008.

In 1993, together with the last PLI leader, Raffaele Costa, Biondi founded the Union of the Centre, a small faction of the new Forza Italia (FI) party. He served as Minister of Justice for a period of eight months (having previously served also as Ecology Minister in the 1980s). Biondi was appointed President of Forza Italia's National Council in 2004. 

Following the dissolution of Forza Italia in 2009, Biondi remained in its successor organisation, the People of Freedom (PdL), for a further two years before leaving to join the refounded Italian Liberal Party. In 2014, Biondi was among a group of disaffected members who broke from that party to form The Liberals (I Liberali).

Honour 
 : Knight Grand Cross of the Order of Merit of the Italian Republic (14 october 2011)

References

External links

1928 births
2020 deaths
People from Pisa
Italian Liberal Party politicians
Forza Italia politicians
The Liberals (Italy) politicians
Italian Ministers of Justice
Environment ministers of Italy
Deputies of Legislature V of Italy
Deputies of Legislature VIII of Italy
Deputies of Legislature IX of Italy
Deputies of Legislature X of Italy
Deputies of Legislature XI of Italy
Deputies of Legislature XII of Italy
Deputies of Legislature XIII of Italy
Deputies of Legislature XIV of Italy
Senators of Legislature XV of Italy
Politicians of Tuscany
Italian politicians convicted of crimes
20th-century Italian lawyers
Knights Grand Cross of the Order of Merit of the Italian Republic